Photinia chihsiniana is a species in the family Rosaceae.

References

chihsiniana